Brunswick County Courthouse may refer to:

Brunswick County Courthouse (North Carolina), Southport, North Carolina
Brunswick County Courthouse (Virginia), Lawrenceville, Virginia